Lake Muskoka (Miller Island) Water Aerodrome  is located  east of Torrance, Ontario, Canada.

References

Registered aerodromes in Ontario
Transport in the District Municipality of Muskoka
Seaplane bases in Ontario